Cheras Hartamas is a neighbourhood in Cheras South, Hulu Langat District, Selangor, Malaysia. It is located at the border of Selangor-Federal Territory of Kuala Lumpur near Perhilitan headquarters, some of the parts of this neighborhood in the north is administrated by Ampang Jaya Municipal Council, while others are being administrated by Kajang Municipal Council.

Hulu Langat District